Mashamoquet Brook State Park is a public recreation area in the town of Pomfret, Connecticut. Notable features of the state park include the Wolf Den national historic site, the Brayton Grist Mill, and the Table Rock and Indian Chair natural stone formations. The state park offers facilities for camping, swimming, fishing, and picnicking. It is managed by the Connecticut Department of Energy and Environmental Protection.

History
Mashamoquet Brook first came to the attention of the State Park Commission when former Pomfret resident Sarah Fay donated eleven and a half acres of the stream's hemlock-lined gorge to the state in 1918. In 1925, that parcel was combined with the Wolf Den, site of Israel Putnam's legendary wolf slaying, which the Daughters of the American Revolution had purchased in 1899. The donation of the Hotchkins Wolf Den Farm parcel in 1957 together with other purchases and gifts brought the park to its present size of over 900 acres.

References

External links

Mashamoquet Brook State Park Connecticut Department of Energy and Environmental Protection
Mashamoquet Brook State Park Map Connecticut Department of Energy and Environmental Protection

State parks of Connecticut
Parks in Windham County, Connecticut
Protected areas established in 1918
Pomfret, Connecticut
Campgrounds in Connecticut
1918 establishments in Connecticut